"" is the national anthem of the Republic of the Congo. It was adopted upon independence from France in 1959, replaced in 1969 by "Les Trois Glorieuses" but reinstated in 1991. The lyrics were written by Jacques Tondra and Georges Kibanghi, and the music was composed by Jean Royer and Joseph Spadilière.

Lyrics

References

External links
 Republic of the Congo: La Congolaise - Audio of the national anthem of the Republic of the Congo, with information and lyrics (archive link)

African anthems
Republic of the Congo music
National symbols of the Republic of the Congo
Republic of the Congo songs
National anthem compositions in F major